The BTR-70DI is a Ukrainian upgrade of the Soviet BTR-70 with BTR-80 hatch and new diesel engines.

Description 
The vehicle is a 8x8 wheeled armoured personnel carrier.

It has 2 FPT Iveco Tector engines (from the Iveco EuroCargo truck) P4 (Euro III), 150 hp each.

Can be optionally fitted with modular turrets "Ingul" or "Bug" or with the "Zaslon" active protection system.

Variants 

 BTR-70DI (БТР-70Дi), also known as BTR-7 "Defender" - armoured personnel carrier
 BTR-70DI-02 "Svityaz" (БТР-70Дi-02 "Свiтязь") - armoured command vehicle. The first vehicle was built in 2012
 BMM-70 (БММ-70) - armored medical vehicle, at least six were built
 BREM-7K (БРЕМ-7К), also known as BREM-2000 - armoured recovery vehicle equipped with specialized lifting and recovery equipment

Operators
 
 : At least nine were captured by Russian forces during the 2022 Russian invasion of Ukraine.

References

Amphibious armoured personnel carriers
Wheeled armoured personnel carriers
Armoured personnel carriers of Ukraine
BTR-70
Eight-wheeled vehicles
Military vehicles introduced in the 2010s
Armoured personnel carriers of the post–Cold War period
Wheeled amphibious armoured fighting vehicles